Pinky Malinky is an animated streaming television series created by Chris Garbutt and Rikke Asbjoern for Nickelodeon and Netflix. It is based on Garbutt's animated short of the same name produced by Cartoon Network Studios Europe (now Hanna-Barbera Studios Europe), which was released in 2009. It marks the first collaboration between Nickelodeon and Netflix as well as the first Nicktoon to be produced exclusively for Netflix. The series chronicles the adventures of Pinky Malinky (voiced by Lucas Grabeel), a 12-year-old middle school student who also happens to be an anthropomorphic hot dog and his efforts to climb up the social ladder with his two-human friends Babs Byuteman (Diamond White) and JJ Jameson (Nathan Kress).

The series premiered on January 1, 2019, and was renewed for a second season ahead of the series premiere. Season 2 was released on April 22, 2019, and the third and final season was released on July 17, 2019. The series was canceled following Season 3. 

Pinky Malinky was nominated for “Best Animation Editing” for the 2020 Daytime Emmy Awards on May 21, 2020. In 2023, Grabeel reprised his role as Pinky in the Netflix interactive special We Lost Our Human, also by Garbutt and Asbjoern.

Production
In 2015, the series was greenlit by Nickelodeon for a pickup of 20 episodes. The series was originally set to premiere on Nickelodeon in 2016, but has gone through many delays. On June 21, 2018, it was announced that Pinky Malinky would be released exclusively on Netflix, and that the show was renewed for a second season. The company's See What's Next Twitter account announced an August 17 release date, but the series failed to premiere on that date. On September 16, 2018, Chris Garbutt posted on Instagram that there was a slight delay in the release date, and that it was Netflix's responsibility on when to release it.

Season 1 was eventually released on January 1, 2019. A 99-second short focusing on the titular character's New Year's resolutions was released ahead of the series premiere.

Voice cast
 Lucas Grabeel as Pinky Malinky
 Nathan Kress as JJ Jameson
 Diamond White as Babs Buttman
 Danny Jacobs as Mr. Malinky
 Retta as Mrs. Malinky
 Lauren Tom as Bus Driver, Tina
 Robbie Daymond as Channing, Perry
 Grey Griffin as Suzie, Dizzy, Zeek, Byron
 Vargus Mason as Bob Buttman
 Colleen Smith as Principal Pfunne
 Angela Malhotra as Aminder 
 Jason Alexander as Mayor Hop
 Scott Kramer as Nurse Sally
 Dee Bradley Baker as Peter
 Ben Schwartz as Coach Freebird
 Flula Borg as Byonk
 Carlos Alazraqui as Large Biker Guy
 Fred Tatasciore as Jimmy
 Josh Engel as Mr. Sweetie
 Zehra Fazal as Aisha
 Eric Bauza as Flynn
 Kimberly Brooks as Carl, Sophie
 Stephanie Sheh as Jessie
 Carl Weathers as The Apologizer
 Amy Sedaris as Helga Hilltop

Episodes

Pilot (2009 and 2011)

Season 1 (2019)

Season 2 (2019)

Season 3 (2019)

References

External links

2010s American animated television series
2010s American mockumentary television series
2010s American school television series
2010s American surreal comedy television series
2019 American television series debuts
2019 American television series endings
2010s Canadian animated television series
2019 Canadian television series debuts
2019 Canadian television series endings
American children's animated comedy television series
Animated television series about children
Canadian children's animated comedy television series
Fictional food characters
Middle school television series
Nicktoons
English-language Netflix original programming
Netflix children's programming
Hanna-Barbera Studios Europe
Television series by Jam Filled Entertainment